The 1972 United States presidential election in Colorado took place on November 7, 1972, as part of the 1972 United States presidential election. State voters chose seven representatives, or electors, to the Electoral College, who voted for president and vice president.

Colorado voted for the Republican incumbent, Richard Nixon, over the Democratic challenger, South Dakota Senator George McGovern. Nixon took 62.61% of the vote to McGovern's 34.59%, a margin of 28.01 points.

Like most of the rest of the Mountain West, Colorado voted powerfully Republican in 1972, giving Nixon a margin in excess of his national margin by 4.8%. Nevertheless, Pitkin County, home to Aspen, shifted powerfully against the national trend, switching from supporting Nixon in 1968 to supporting McGovern in 1972.

Results

Results by county

References

1972
Colorado
1972 Colorado elections